James Rooney may refer to:
 James Rooney (Canadian politician) (1897–1969), member of the House of Commons of Canada
 James F. Rooney (born 1935), Wisconsin politician
 James Rooney (American football), American football coach
 Jimmy Rooney (born 1945), Scottish/Australian footballer
 Jim Rooney (soccer) (born 1968), American soccer player
 Jim Rooney (Scottish footballer) (born 1956), played for Queen's Park, Morton, St. Mirren, Dumbarton, Clyde and East Stirling
 Jim Rooney (music) (born 1938), American music producer

See also
 Jamie Rooney (born 1980), English rugby league footballer 
 Jamie Rooney (lacrosse) (born 1984), Canadian lacrosse player
 J.P. Rooneys, a professional football team named after Pennsylvania politician James P. Rooney